Jaworze may refer to the following places in Poland:
Jaworze, Kuyavian-Pomeranian Voivodeship (north-central Poland)
Jaworze, Silesian Voivodeship (south Poland)
Jaworze, Subcarpathian Voivodeship (south-east Poland)
Jaworze, Świętokrzyskie Voivodeship (south-central Poland)
Jaworze, West Pomeranian Voivodeship (north-west Poland)
Gmina Jaworze, a rural gmina in Bielsko County, Silesian Voivodeship